The Anakie Football and Netball Club, nicknamed the Roos, is an Australian rules football and netball club based in the town of Anakie, 20 km north of Geelong, Victoria. 

The Anakie teams currently compete in the Geelong DFL, with the football squad having entered in 1936 and netball in 2002.

History
Club originated from the Durdidwarrah Football Club which was formed when the Geelong Water and Sewerage Trust constructed storage dams in the Brisbane ranges. Durdidwarrah were premiers in 1914 on completion of the dams works moved to the Anakie area.

After the end of the WWI, the club was competing in the Leigh Cup competition until it disbanded in 1923. The club moved to the Mathison Cup in 1924, and then later the Elliott Cup. In 1936 the club moved to the Geelong Sub-District Football league. 
They were accepted into Woolworth Cup (2nd division) competition of the GDFL in 1949. The club had the occasional success in the 1960s as they were a middle-of-the-road club that would make the finals only to lose at the end of the season.

Premierships 
 Mathieson Cup (1):
 1926
 Geelong & District Football League (4):
 1967(Woolworth Cup), 1985 (Div 2 Seniors & Reserves), 1991(Div 1 Seniors & Reserves), 1994(Div 1 Seniors)
 Netball 
2013 (GDFNL B Grade)

VFL/AFL players
 Eric Tucker - 
 Neil Tucker - ,

References

External links
 Twitter page
 Facebook page
 Teamapp site

Bibliography
 Cat Country: History of Football In The Geelong Region by John Stoward – 

Geelong & District Football League clubs
Australian rules football clubs established in 1970
1970 establishments in Australia
Netball teams in Victoria (Australia)
Australian rules football clubs in Victoria (Australia)